The 2008 United States House of Representatives election in Alaska was held on November 4, 2008, to determine who will represent the state of Alaska in the United States House of Representatives. Alaska has one seat in the House, apportioned according to the 2000 United States Census. Representatives are elected for two-year terms; whoever was elected would serve in the 111th Congress from January 4, 2009, until January 3, 2011. The election coincided with the nationwide presidential election. The primary election was held August 26, 2008.

Background
Alaska's at-large congressional district covers the entire state, and has been represented by Republican Don Young since 1973. He was challenged by Democratic nominee Ethan Berkowitz and Alaskan Independence candidate Don Wright.

Berkowitz won the Democratic primary against Diane E. Benson and Jake Metcalfe. The Republican primary was so close that Young and Sean Parnell needed to wait for the overseas absentee ballots, which had until September 10, 2008, to arrive and be counted. Young held a narrow lead of 239 votes after counting the other absentee and questioned ballots on September 6, 2008. Final results on September 18 showed Young winning by 304 votes, and Parnell announced that he would not seek a recount. 

According to the 9/15-17 Research 2000 poll for Daily Kos, Berkowitz led Young in the general election by a 53%–39% margin, with a ±4% margin of error. After the primary, CQ Politics changed its forecast to 'Leans Democratic'. The Cook Political Report ranked it 'Republican Toss Up' and The Rothenberg Political Report rated it 'Democrat Favored'.

On November 12, 2008, Young was declared the winner, retaining the seat for his 19th term, despite a strong challenge from Berkowitz. Young was proclaimed winner, getting 50% of the vote compared to Berkowitz's 45%.

Candidates

Alaskan Independence
 Don Wright

Democratic
Ethan Berkowitz, nominee — former Minority Leader, Alaska House of Representatives
Diane E. Benson — 2006 nominee, 2002 Green Party nominee for Governor
Jake Metcalfe — former chair of the Alaska Democratic Party. He suspended his campaign amid allegations that his political adviser, Bill Scannell, had purchased domain names — containing Berkowitz's name — that re-directed users to a mock blog, and a San Francisco LGBT web site.

Republican
Don Young, nominee — incumbent Congressman
Gabrielle LeDoux — State Representative 
Sean Parnell — Lieutenant Governor of Alaska

Polling

Results 
Primary elections were held on August 26, 2008.

ADL primary 
The "ADL" ballot contained all of the primary candidates for the Alaska Democratic Party, the Alaskan Independence Party, and Libertarian Party of Alaska.

Republican primary

General election

References
Specific

General
 2008 Competitive House Race Chart The Cook Political Report, November 4, 2008.
 2008 House Ratings The Rothenberg Political Report, November 2, 2008

External links
Race ranking and details from CQ Politics
U.S. Congress candidates for Alaska at Project Vote Smart
Alaska U.S. House Races from 2008 Race Tracker
Campaign contributions for Alaska congressional races from OpenSecrets
Young (R-i) vs Berkowitz (D) graph of collected poll results from Pollster.com
2008 Election from The Anchorage Daily News newspaper
Official campaign websites
Don Young for Congress, Republican Incumbent
Sean Parnell for Congress. Republican
Gabrielle LeDoux for Congress, Republican 
Diane Benson for Congress, Democratic
Ethan Berkowitz for Congress, Democratic
Jake Metcalfe for Congress, Democratic

2008
laska
United States House of Representatives